Statistics of Armenian Premier League in the 1994 season.

 Zangezour, Lori Vanadzor and Aznavour FC were promoted.
 Zvartnots Echmiadzin changed their name to BMA-Arai Echmiadzin.

League table

Results

Top goalscorers

See also
 1994 in Armenian football
 1994 Armenian First League
 1994 Armenian Cup

Armenian Premier League seasons
1
Armenia
Armenia